Coleophora alashiae is a moth of the family Coleophoridae. It is found on Cyprus.

References

alashiae
Moths described in 1996
Moths of Europe